Mary Jane Wilson DamTE  (3 October 1840 – 18 October 1916), or Maria of Saint Francis, was an Englishwoman born in India who founded the Congregation of the Franciscan Sisters of Our Lady of Victories. She was declared venerable by Pope Francis.

Biography
Wilson was born in Hurryhur, Mysore to English parents, and grew up in the Anglican faith. After the death of her parents she moved to England to the care of an aunt. She converted to Catholicism, and was baptised in France on 11 May 1873.

In 1881 she moved to Madeira island, in Portugal, to nurse an Englishwoman. She settled in Funchal and lived the rest of her life on Madeira. In 1884 she co-founded, with Amélia Amaro de Sá, the religious Congregation of the Franciscan Sisters of Our Lady of Victories (FNSV, in Portuguese: Congregação das Irmãs Franciscanas de Nossa Senhora das Vitórias).  In 1907 she nursed patients throughout a smallpox epidemic, and was awarded the honour of "Tower and Sword" (Torre e Espada). The revolution of October 1910 forced her to leave Madeira, but she returned a year later. She died in Madeira, aged 76, on 18 October 1916. She was declared Venerable on 9 October 2013.

A small museum in Funchal is dedicated to her life and work, and there is a sculpture of her, by Luís Paixão, in the municipal gardens in Santa Cruz. Furthermore, in Largo Severiano Ferraz, also in Funchal, there is a bronze statue of her likeness, sculpted in  2006 by Ricardo Velosa.  A book on her life The invincible Victorian, the life of Mary Jane Wilson by Terry Dunphy was published in about 1950 by the  Franciscan Sisters of Our Lady of Victories.

Honours 

  Dame of Order of Tower and Sword, Portugal (1907)

References

1840 births
1916 deaths
19th-century venerated Christians
20th-century venerated Christians
Venerated Catholics by Pope Francis
Converts to Roman Catholicism from Anglicanism
People from Davanagere district
People from Madeira
Recipients of the Order of the Tower and Sword
19th-century British Roman Catholic nuns
British people in colonial India
20th-century Roman Catholic nuns